Primula austrofrigida, syn. Dodecatheon austrofrigidum, is a species of flowering plant in the primrose family known by the common names frigid shooting star and tundra shooting star. It is native to Washington and Oregon in the United States, where it grows in the coastal mountain ranges, including those on the Olympic Peninsula.

This plant has a basal clump of leaves up to 30 centimeters long by 7 wide and have smooth to wavy or somewhat toothed edges. The inflorescence is borne on a flowering stalk up to 45 centimeters tall. It has one to seven flowers with magenta corolla lobes up to 2 centimeters long or more which are reflexed away from the flower center. The stamens are maroon or purple and forms a protruding tube.

This plant grows on rocky slopes on river banks and other seasonally moist, rocky areas. It may grow with various mosses that form a substrate that it can root in. Associated plants include Alnus rubra, Filipendula occidentalis, Rubus parviflorus, Rubus spectabilis, Saxifraga occidentalis, Saxifraga nuttallii, Saxifraga mertensiana, and Mimulus guttatus, though it often grows on slopes with few other plants around. At higher elevations the plant occupies grassy turf. The soil is thin. The plant has also been found growing in substrates of decomposing wood. Associated species at higher elevations include Abies amabilis, Tsuga heterophylla, Cladothamnus sp., and Synthyris schizantha.

This plant is known to occur at only about eight locations. Populations are small and scattered. Threats include increased flooding caused by grazing and logging upstream. The status of the rivers next to populations affects population size; the plant numbers may decrease during flood conditions and then increase the following year.

References

External links
USDA Plants Profile for Dodecatheon austrofrigidum
Washington Burke Museum: Dodecatheon austrofrigidum
Plantsystematics.org:  description and photos

austrofrigida
Endemic flora of the United States
Flora of Oregon
Flora of Washington (state)
Plants described in 2006
Endangered flora of the United States